The 2019–20 Coupe de France preliminary rounds, overseas departments and territories are the qualifying competitions to decide which teams from the leagues of the overseas departments and territories of France take part in the main competition from the seventh round. Separate qualifying competitions take place in Guadeloupe, French Guiana, Martinique, Mayotte, Réunion (including Saint Martin) and Saint Pierre and Miquelon. Two teams from each of the qualifying competitions of Guadeloupe, French Guiana, Martinique and Réunion are included in the seventh round draw, as is one team from the qualifying competition of Mayotte. The winning team from the Saint Pierre and Miquelon qualifying competition is placed into one of the mainland Regional qualifying competitions at the third round stage.

In 2018–19, Aiglon du Lamentin from Martinique were the longest surviving in the main competition, reaching the round of 64 before losing to Orléans after extra time.

Mayotte
The draw was originally made on 14 February 2019, with a total of 48 clubs participating from Régionale 1, Régional 2 and Régionale 3 divisions. This draw was subsequently cancelled, and replaced on 20 February 2019 with an expanded draw involving 65 clubs, including teams from Régionale 4. To achieve this, a preliminary round with one match was required. Note that the Mayotte League continue to refer to this as the first round.

The second round draw was published on 19 April 2019, with 16 ties being drawn.

The third round draw was published on 4 June 2019, with 8 ties being drawn.

The fourth round draw was published on 16 July 2019, with 4 ties being drawn.

The fifth round draw was published on 16 August 2019, with 2 ties being drawn.

The details of the sixth round match were published on 8 October 2019.

Preliminary round (Mayotte)
This match was played on 27 February 2019.

Note: Mayotte League structure (no promotion to French League structure):Régionale 1 (R1)Régionale 2 (R2)Régionale 3 (R3)Régionale 4 (R4)

First round (Mayotte)
These matches were played on 20 and 27 March 2019.

Note: Mayotte League structure (no promotion to French League structure):Régionale 1 (R1)Régionale 2 (R2)Régionale 3 (R3)Régionale 4 (R4)

Second round (Mayotte)
These matches were played on 4 May 2019, with one rescheduled for 10 June 2019.

Note: Mayotte League structure (no promotion to French League structure):Régionale 1 (R1)Régionale 2 (R2)Régionale 3 (R3)Régionale 4 (R4)

Third round (Mayotte)
These matches were played between 22 and 29 June 2019.

Note: Mayotte League structure (no promotion to French League structure):Régionale 1 (R1)Régionale 2 (R2)Régionale 3 (R3)Régionale 4 (R4)

Fourth round (Mayotte)
These matches were played on 3 August 2019.

Note: Mayotte League structure (no promotion to French League structure):Régionale 1 (R1)Régionale 2 (R2)Régionale 3 (R3)Régionale 4 (R4)

Fifth round (Mayotte)
These matches were played on 14 September 2019, with one replayed on 29 September 2019.

Note: Mayotte League structure (no promotion to French League structure):Régionale 1 (R1)Régionale 2 (R2)Régionale 3 (R3)Régionale 4 (R4)

Sixth round (Mayotte)
This match was played on 12 October 2019.

Note: Mayotte League structure (no promotion to French League structure):Régionale 1 (R1)Régionale 2 (R2)Régionale 3 (R3)Régionale 4 (R4)

Réunion
The draw for the competition was made on 12 April 2019, with a total of 42 clubs participating from Régionale 1 and Régional 2 divisions. To achieve the required outcome of two clubs qualifying for the seventh round, a total of five rounds are required. To align with the other qualifying competitions, this competition starts at the second round. The 14 Régionale 1 clubs and 8 of the Régionale 2 clubs were exempted to the third round.

Rounds three to six were straight knockouts, each drawn in two groups, to produce one winning team who would play in the seventh round at home and one winning team who would travel to France.

Second round (Réunion)
These matches were played on 20 and 21 April 2019. with one rescheduled for 2 June 2019. 

Note: Reúnion League structure (no promotion to French League structure):Régionale 1 (R1)Régionale 2 (R2)Départementale 1 (D1)

Third round (Réunion)
These matches were played between 1 and 7 June 2019.

Note: Reúnion League structure (no promotion to French League structure):Régionale 1 (R1)Régionale 2 (R2)Départementale 1 (D1)

Fourth round (Réunion)
These matches were played on 18 August 2019.

Note: Reúnion League structure (no promotion to French League structure):Régionale 1 (R1)Régionale 2 (R2)Départementale 1 (D1)

Fifth round (Réunion)
These matches are scheduled to be played on 14, 15 and 25 September 2019.

Note: Reúnion League structure (no promotion to French League structure):Régionale 1 (R1)Régionale 2 (R2)Départementale 1 (D1)

Sixth round (Réunion)
These matches were played on 27 October 2019.

Note: Reúnion League structure (no promotion to French League structure):Régionale 1 (R1)Régionale 2 (R2)Départementale 1 (D1)

French Guiana
The initial draw was made on 8 July 2019, with a total of 32 teams competing from Régionale 1 and Régionale 2 divisions.
The draw for the fourth round was published on 16 September 2019. Eight ties were drawn.

The draw for the fifth round was published on 30 September 2019. Four ties were drawn.

The draw for the sixth round was published on 16 October 2019. The two final ties were drawn, the winners of which qualify for the seventh round.

Third round: (French Guiana) 

This season, the preliminary rounds start with the third round, due to the number of teams entered.
These matches were played between 21 and 25 August 2019, with two rearranged for 7 September 2019 and one rearranged for 14 September.

Note: French Guiana League structure (no promotion to French League structure):Régional 1 (R1)Régional 2 (R2)

Fourth round: (French Guiana) 

These matches were played between 18 and 21 September 2019.

Note: French Guiana League structure (no promotion to French League structure):Régional 1 (R1)Régional 2 (R2)

Fifth round: (French Guiana) 

These matches were played on 5 October 2019.

Note: French Guiana League structure (no promotion to French League structure):Régional 1 (R1)Régional 2 (R2)

Sixth round: (French Guiana) 

These matches were played on 25 and 26 October 2019.

Note: French Guiana League structure (no promotion to French League structure):Régional 1 (R1)Régional 2 (R2)

Martinique 
A total of 52 teams from the three Régionale divisions entered the competition. Twelve teams (eleven from Régionale 1 and one from Régionale 2) were awarded a bye in the opening round, leaving 20 ties involving 40 teams. Only 19 were played, with the tie between Olympique Le Marin and AS Silver Star being void due to AS Silver Star withdrawing. 

In the third round, the 19 winners were joined by AS Silver Star plus the twelve original byes, with 16 ties drawn. In the fourth round, eight ties were drawn.

The fifth round draw was made on 30 September 2019, with four ties drawn.

The sixth round draw was made on 12 October 2019, with two ties drawn.

Second round (Martinique)
This season, the preliminary rounds start with the second round, due to the number of clubs entered.
These matches were played between 24 and 31 August 2019.

Note: Martinique League structure (no promotion to French League structure):Régionale 1 (R1)Régionale 2 (R2)Régionale 3 (R3)

Third round (Martinique)
These matches were played between 13 and 15 September 2019.

Note: Martinique League structure (no promotion to French League structure):Régionale 1 (R1)Régionale 2 (R2)Régionale 3 (R3)

Fourth round (Martinique)
These matches were played on 24 and 25 September 2019.

Note: Martinique League structure (no promotion to French League structure):Régionale 1 (R1)Régionale 2 (R2)Régionale 3 (R3)

Fifth round (Martinique)
These matches were played on 4 and 5 October 2019.

Note: Martinique League structure (no promotion to French League structure):Régionale 1 (R1)Régionale 2 (R2)Régionale 3 (R3)

Sixth round (Martinique)
These matches were played on 23 October 2019.

Note: Martinique League structure (no promotion to French League structure):Régionale 1 (R1)Régionale 2 (R2)Régionale 3 (R3)

Guadeloupe
The draw for the opening round was made on 10 August 2019, with a total of 52 clubs participating. To align with the other qualifying competitions, this competition started at the second round. Twelve clubs from the Régional 1 division were exempted to the third round.

The sixteen ties of the third round were drawn on 3 September 2019. The fourth round draw, with eight ties, followed on 20 September 2019. The draw for the fifth round was made at the start of October 2019. The sixth round was drawn in the week of 25 October 2019. The sixth round was drawn in the week of 25 October 2019.

Second round (Guadeloupe)

This season, the preliminary rounds start with the second round, due to the number of clubs entering.
These matches were played between 31 August and 10 September 2019.

Note: Guadeloupe League structure (no promotion to French League structure):Ligue Régionale 1 (R1)Ligue Régionale 2 (R2)Ligue Régionale 3 (R3)

Third round (Guadeloupe)

These matches were played between 13 and 15 September 2019, with two postponed until 28 September 2019.

Note: Guadeloupe League structure (no promotion to French League structure):Ligue Régionale 1 (R1)Ligue Régionale 2 (R2)Ligue Régionale 3 (R3)

Fourth round (Guadeloupe)

These matches were played on 28 and 29 September 2019, with the exception of two games which were dependent on late games in the previous round, and are scheduled to be played on 6 and 9 October 2019.

Note: Guadeloupe League structure (no promotion to French League structure):Ligue Régionale 1 (R1)Ligue Régionale 2 (R2)Ligue Régionale 3 (R3)

Fifth round (Guadeloupe)

These matches were played on 16 and 19 October 2019.

Note: Guadeloupe League structure (no promotion to French League structure):Ligue Régionale 1 (R1)Ligue Régionale 2 (R2)Ligue Régionale 3 (R3)

Sixth round (Guadeloupe)

These matches were played on 26 and 27 October 2019.

Note: Guadeloupe League structure (no promotion to French League structure):Ligue Régionale 1 (R1)Ligue Régionale 2 (R2)Ligue Régionale 3 (R3)

Saint Pierre and Miquelon
Following a debut last year the Overseas Collectivity of Saint Pierre and Miquelon had a qualifying competition again. With only three teams in the collectivity, there is just one match in each of two rounds, with one team receiving a bye to the second round. The winner, AS Îlienne Amateurs, gained entry to the third round draw of the Auvergne-Rhône-Alpes region.

First round (Saint Pierre and Miquelon)
The match was played on 19 June 2019.

Second round (Saint Pierre and Miquelon)
The match was played on 3 July 2019.

References

Preliminary rounds